The Peace Race (()) was an annual multiple stage bicycle race held in the Eastern Bloc states of Czechoslovakia, East Germany, and Poland. First organized in 1948, it was originally created with the intent of relieving tensions existing between Central European countries following the interwar period and World War II.

Maintained by the three states ruling Communist parties' newspapers (Rudé právo, Neues Deutschland, and Trybuna Ludu), it was dubbed to be the "world's biggest amateur cycling race" and "Tour de France of the East".

Following the fall of Communism in 1989, the Peace Race was no longer state-sponsored and organizers faced trouble with gathering funds. The event was last held in 2006.

History 
The first Peace Race was held in 1948, when there were two editions connecting the cities of Warsaw and Prague. The one to Prague was won by August Prosinek, the other one to Warsaw by Alexander Zoric, both from Yugoslavia. During the Cold War the Peace Race was known as the 'Tour de France of the East'.

Because cyclists from the Eastern Bloc were not allowed to become professional by their governments; it was a purely amateur race. It attracted the best cyclists from communist countries, plus guest teams from non-communist countries. Communist-bloc riders tended to dominate the event, but there were exceptions: Briton Ian Steel won the 1952 race, and the British League of Racing Cyclists team also won the team competition – the first time that both classifications had gone to the same nation.

An Indian team took part in the race in 1952, 1954 and 1955. Indian racers were popular with the public, although they were not competitive. In 1954, Supravat Chravati completed the race in 77th position, 19 hours and 16 seconds after the winner. In 1955, Dhana Singh finished 28 hours, 24 minutes and 38 seconds after the winner.

One of the later winners was Russian Sergei Sukhoruchenkov, who also won the gold medal on the Olympic Road Race in 1980.

The most successful riders in the Peace Race were: Steffen Wesemann from Germany who won the race five times; Ryszard Szurkowski from Poland and Uwe Ampler from East Germany each won the race four times. Gustav-Adolf Schur, who won the race twice, was voted the most popular East German sportsman ever in 1989.

After the end of the Cold War, the race lost its significance. No race was held in 2005, and the 2006 race turned out to be the last.

In 2006, the 58th edition took place on 13–20 May. It started in Linz in Austria and via the Czech Republic headed to Germany where it ended in Hannover. No capital city of these countries was crossed during the race.

After 2006, the race was removed from the cycling calendar.

Legacy
In April/May 2012 Alan Buttler organised a re-run of the 1955 Peace Race as a tribute to his father, Alf Buttler, who was the GB cycling team mechanic for many events in the 1950s, 60s and 70s. He was joined by former peace riders including Gustav-Adolf Schur, Geoff Wiles, John Woodburn, Alan Jacob, and Axel Peschel.

There is a museum in Kleinmühlingen in Germany dedicated to the Peace Race.

Junior Peace Race
A Junior Peace Race was first held in 1965 and held again the following year. After a hiatus it was revived in 1974 and has been held every year since, continuing after the senior race was no longer organised. Several riders who won the junior race have gone on to senior success, including Roman Kreuziger Sr., Roman Kreuziger Jr., Denis Menchov, Fabian Cancellara, Peter Velits, Tanel Kangert and Michal Kwiatkowski.

Peace Race U23
An Under-23 Peace Race for riders under 23 years was added in 2013. From 2015 the race has been part of the UCI Under 23 Nations' Cup.

List of races 

 P = prologue
 E = epilogue

Most individual wins
Cyclists with three wins at least listed

Overall:

 5 wins: Steffen Wesemann
 4 wins: Ryszard Szurkowski, Uwe Ampler

Sprinter competition:

 8 wins: Olaf Ludwig
 3 wins: Ryszard Szurkowski

Mountain climbers competition:

 3 wins: Sergei Sukhoruchenkov, Uwe Ampler, Jaroslav Bílek

Most team wins

 20 wins: Soviet Union
 10 wins: East Germany
 9 wins: Poland
 5 wins: Czechoslovakia
 3 wins: Team Mroz

Winners by country
Individual overall competitions were won by cyclist from following countries:

 12 wins: East Germany
 10 wins: Soviet Union
 7 wins: Poland, Germany
 5 wins: Denmark
 4 wins: Czechoslovakia
 3 wins: Czech Republic
 2 wins: SFR Yugoslavia, France, Italy
 1 win: United Kingdom, Bulgaria, Netherlands, Belgium

See also
Czech Cycling Tour
Tour de Pologne
Deutschland Tour

References

Further reading

 

01. K. Małcużyński, Zygmund Weiss : Kronika wielkiego wyścigu, Ksiażka i wiedza, Warszawa, 1952

02. Adolf Klimanschewsky: Warschau-Berlin-Prag. Ein Erlebnisbericht von der Friedensfahrt 1952. Sportverlag, Berlin, 1953.

03. Brigitte Roszak/Klaus Kickbusch (Redaktion): Friedensfahrt. Sportverlag, Berlin, 1954.

04. VII. Internationale Friedensfahrt. Volkskunstverlag Reichenbach, 1955.

05. VIII. Wyscig Pokoju, Zavod Miru, Friedensfahrt. Verlag: Sport i Turystika, Warszawa 1955.

06. Horst Schubert: Etappengefüster. Sportverlag, Berlin, 1956.

07. Horst Schubert u.a.:Jedes Jahr im Mai. Sportverlag, Berlin, 1957.

08. Herbert Kronfeld: Zwischen Start und Ziel. Sportverlag, Berlin, 1957.

09. Egon Lemke: Giganten der Pedale. Verlag Junge Welt, Berlin, 1958.

10. Autorenkollektiv: Friedensfahrt. Sportverlag, Berlin, 1962.

11. Klaus Ullrich: Kluge Köpfe - schnelle Beine. Sportverlag, Berlin, 1963.

12. Alles über alle Friedensfahrer. Verlag Neues Deutschland, Berlin, 1964.

13. Täves Friedensfahrtlexikon. Verlag Neues Deutschland, Berlin, 1965.

14. Klaus Ullrich (Hrsg.): Fahrt der Millionen. Sportverlag, Berlin, 1967.

15. Trzdziesci lat Wyscigu Pokoju. Krajowa Agencja Wydawnicza, Warszawa, 1977.

16. Klaus Ullrich: Die große Fahrt. Sportverlag, Berlin, 1977.

17. Günter Teske: Das gelbe Trikot. Verlag Neues Leben, Berlin, 1981.

18. Klaus Ullrich: Jedes Mal im Mai, Sportverlag, Berlin, 1986, .

19. Ulf Harms: Der verschwundene Friedensfahrer. Militärverlag der DDR, Berlin, 1987, .

20. Gustav-Adolf Schur (Hrsg.): Friedensfahrt, Spotless-Verlag, Berlin, 1995, .

21. Tilo Köhler: Der Favorit fuhr Kowalit: Täve Schur und die Friedensfahrt. Gustav Kiepenheuer Verlag, 1997, .

22. Manfred Hönel/Olaf Ludwig: 100 Highlights Friedensfahrt. Sportverlag, Berlin,1997, .

23. Maik Märtin: 50 Jahre Course de la Paix, Agentur Construct, Leipzig, 1998, ISBN: ohne.

24. Klaus Ullrich Huhn: Die Geschichte der Friedensfahrt. Spotless-Verlag, Berlin, 2001, .

25. Bogdan Tuszynski/ Daniel Marszalek: Wyscik Pokoju 1948-2001, Verlag FDK Warszawa, Warszawa, 2002, 

26. Andreas Ciesielski: Das Wunder von Warschau, Scheunen-Verlag, Kückenshagen, 2005, 

27. Alan Buttler/Klaus Huhn: Wie die Friedensfahrt "ausgegraben" wurde, NORA Verlagsgemeinschaft Dyck & Westerheide, Berlin, o.J., 

28. Rainer Sprehe: Alles Rower? Ein Wessi auf Friedensfahrt. Covadonga-Verlag, Bielefeld 2012, 

Audio/Video:

 Kopfsteinpflaster und Asphalt. Radio-Feature des MDR. 1 CD. Pool Music und Media,     1998, 4260031180232.
 Hagen Boßdorf: Geschichte     der Friedensfahrt. VHS-Video. 1997, .
 Friedensfahrt Course de la Paix 1978, Dokumentation des WDR, Köln, 1978
 Damals in der DDR. 3 CDs, 2001, BMG 743218855023.

Cycle races in Germany
Cycle races in Poland
Cycle races in the Czech Republic
Cycle races in Slovakia
UCI Europe Tour races
Recurring sporting events established in 1948
1948 establishments in Czechoslovakia
1948 establishments in Germany
1948 establishments in Poland
Recurring events disestablished in 2006
Eastern Bloc
Cold War
Czechoslovakia–Poland relations
Defunct cycling races